Association football  is the most popular sport in Ghana. Since 1957, the sport has been administered by the Ghana Football Association. Internationally, Ghana is represented by the male Black Stars and the female Black Queens. The top male domestic football league in Ghana is the Ghana Premier League, and the top female domestic football league in Ghana is the Ghana Women's Football League.

History
It is on record that the game of football was introduced into the Gold Coast region towards the close of the 19th century by merchants from Europe. Sailors during their leisure times played football among themselves and sometimes with a select side of the  indigenous people. The popularity of the game spread like wild fire within a short time along the coast culminating in the formation of the first football club, Excelsior, in 1903 by Mr. Briton, a Jamaican-born Briton, who was then the Head Teacher of Philip Quaicoe Government Boys School in Cape Coast.

Ghana national men's football team

 
The Black Stars team is one of the highly rated national football teams in Africa. Ghana has won the African Cup of Nations championships on four occasions. They also reached the last sixteen of the 2006 FIFA World Cup before being eliminated by the Brazil. At the 2010 FIFA World Cup in South Africa, they became the third African team in history to reach the World Cup quarter-finals. Some illustrious players have been Charles Kumi Gyamfi, Abédi Pelé, Abdul Razak, Tony Yeboah, Samuel Kuffour and Michael Essien.

The youth teams have been successful as well. The U-17 team regularly competes in the FIFA U-17 World Cup and has won it twice and were runners-up twice. The U-20 team were runners-up twice in the FIFA U-20 World Cup, and in 2009 the Black Satellites completed the double by winning the 2009 African Youth Championship and being crowned 2009 U-20 World Cup Champions thus becoming the first African Country to win the U-20 World Cup Championship. In 1992, Olympic U-23 team became the first African country to win a medal at Olympic Games football and in 2011 the Black Meteors were crowned 2011 All-Africa Games champions for the first time. Former Black Stars senior squad members such as Sulley Muntari, Michael Essien, John Mensah and captain Stephen Appiah all got their start at these youth tournaments.

In 2014, Ghana was one of the eight nations to take part in the first Unity World Cup.

Top goalscorers
As of 26 June 2014, the players with the most goals for the senior Ghanaian national team are:

Ghana national women's football team
 
The Black Queens have taken part in all the FIFA Women's World Cup championships since 1999. The team has however failed to go beyond the first round on each occasion. Ghana has also been runner up to Nigeria on three occasions in the African Women's Championships. Two Ghanaians, Alberta Sackey and Adjoa Bayor have been voted African Women Player of the Year.

Ghana Premier League

Ghanaian FA Cup

Ghana Super Cup

Ghana Women's Football League

Accra Sports Stadium disaster

Football Academies 
Since the late 1990s, European clubs and entrepreneurs have started establishing football academies in Ghana. Among the first ones were Ajax, Feyenoord, and Right to Dream. Unlike other youth teams in Ghana (also known as colts), academies offer an educational setting alongside football training. In the 2010s, locally-based academies have started to spring up across the country. King James Asuming established Kumasi Sports Academy in Kumasi, which, unlike most academies in Ghana, offers a program for boys and girls. Kumasi Sports Academy kickstarted the career of multiple female footballers, including Blessing Shine Agbomadzi, defender for the Black Queens. Ernest Kufuor established Unistar Soccer Academy in the town of Kasoa-Ofaakor. Dozens of footballers started playing at Unistar, including Lumor Agbenyenu, defender for the Black Stars. Unistar is also known for its urban impact. Many of the town's residents attested that Unistar had attracted new visitors, businesses and residents, improving the town’s infrastructures and general wellbeing. Mandela Soccer Academy was established in Accra by Mohammed Issa with a main goal of leveraging football’s universal appeal to advance broader visions of youth and community empowerment. Patmos Arhin, who currently plays for Turkish club Boluspor, played at Mandela Soccer Academy for several years.

Notable players

African Player of the Year and notable players

In the 1990s, Abédi Pelé and Tony Yeboah received FIFA World Player of the Year top ten nominations: the following decade Sammy Kuffour and Michael Essien received Ballon d'Or nominations. Abédi Pelé was listed in the 2004 "FIFA 100" greatest living footballers.

On 13 January 2007, the Confederation of African Football voted Abédi Pelé, Michael Essien, Tony Yeboah, Karim Abdul Razak and Samuel Kuffour as members of the CAF top 30 best African players of all-time. In addition, Abédi and Yeboah were voted as among of the best African players of the century in 1999 by IFFHS.

Men
 Abédi Pelé – FIFA 100, WPOY Nom.1991, 9th 1992, 1991, 1992, 1993 APOY Winner, APOY Nom. 85,86,87,88,89,90, 5th Best African Player of All-Time
 Karim Abdul Razak – 1978 APOY Winner, 6th 1983, 26th Best African Player of All-Time
 Ibrahim Sunday – 1971 APOY Winner
 Samuel Kuffour – Ballon d'Or Nom. 2001, APOY Runner-up 1999,2001, 27th Best African Player of All-Time
 Tony Yeboah – WPOY 9th 1993, Ballon d'Or 23rd 1995, APOY Runner-up 1993, 3rd 1992, 6th 1991, 10th 1996, 24th Best African Player of All-Time
 Michael Essien – FIFA World Player of the Year – 22nd 2005, 22nd 2006, 15th 2007; Ballon d'Or – 24th 2007 27th 2006, 22nd 2005; APOY – 2nd 2007, 3rd 2006, 3rd 2005, 11th Best African Player of All-Time

Women
 Alberta Sackey – 2002 AWPOY Winner
 Adjoa Bayor – 2003 AWPOY Winner

See also

References